Aindu is a village in Viljandi Parish, Viljandi County, Estonia.  It has a population of 33 (as of 1 January 2010).

References

Villages in Viljandi County